Arthur Findlay College is a college of Spiritualism and psychic sciences at Stansted Hall in Stansted Mountfitchet, Essex, England.

Stansted Hall was built in 1871, and the college was founded there in 1964. In accordance with Arthur Findlay's wishes, the college building and grounds are administered by the Spiritualists' National Union (SNU). The head offices of SNU at Redwoods are within the college grounds.  Course prices include daily meals, tuition and accommodations.

History of Stansted Hall 
Stansted Hall, built in 1871, was given to the Spiritualists' National Union in by J. Arthur Findlay, MBE, JP, a former honorary president of the SNU, and in accordance with his wishes is administered by the Union as a college for the advancement of psychic science.

Findlay bought the estate in 1923 upon his retirement from business and first mooted the idea of a spiritualist college at Stansted to the union in 1945. After personal contacts with three successive SNU presidents, a will was drawn up, and in 1954 the National Council accepted the proposed bequest of Stansted Hall with an endowment. This was followed by a later gift in the form of stock to be used for furnishing and decorating, and in 1964, a year after the death of his wife, Findlay transferred the hall, grounds and endowment to the union. Findlay died in July 1964.

Subjects taught
 Mediumship
 Spiritualist Healing
 Meditation
Spiritual Development
 Sound and Colour
 Philosophy
 Psychic Art and Auragraphs
 Trance

Rooms
 The Sanctuary
 The Library. A portrait of Gordon Higginson hangs here.
 The Blue Room
Lecture Room
Large Lounge
 Guest Accommodation
 Britten Memorial Museum

Alumni
 John Holland
 Mark Anthony
 Alex Palermo

Movie documentations 
 Stansted Hall

References

External links
 College website

Bible colleges
Spiritualist organizations
Educational institutions established in 1964
Religious organisations based in the United Kingdom
1964 establishments in England
Stansted Mountfitchet